Bidorpitia unguifera is a species of moth of the family Tortricidae. It is found in Carchi Province, Ecuador.

The wingspan is about 21 mm. The ground colour of the forewings is dirty cream, suffused and sprinkled with brown. The hindwings are brownish cream to the middle, darker in the remaining area and brown on the periphery.

Etymology
The species name refers to the shape of the lateral processes of the arms of the gnathos and is derived from Latin unguis (meaning claw) and fero (meaning carry).

References

Moths described in 2008
Euliini
Moths of South America
Taxa named by Józef Razowski